The Tsunami Brothers were a turntablism duo consisting of DJ Bobby B and DJ Shakey Bonez, who are best known as members of the Kottonmouth Kings.

Tsunami Bros Creation
At soundcheck during Kottonmouth Kings tours the two would jump behind the turntables to pass the time. After numerous tours they decided to take their ideas and record them. Bobby B worked on the scratching along with Bonez who also worked on the drums. From there Bobby B laid down the rest of the production. This resulted in the two inviting all the artists on Suburban Noize, at the time, to come down and record vocals over their beats. Guest vocalists include the vocalists of the Kottonmouth Kings (and Pakelika too), Judge D, Big B, Phunk Junkeez, and Kona Gold.

Discography

King Harbor (2003)
King Harbor is the only studio album from American turntablism duo the Tsunami Brothers. It was released on July 22, 2003.

References

Suburban Noize Records artists
Musicians from Redondo Beach, California